Yaleh Qarshow (also Romanized as Yaleh Qārshow, Yelah Qārshū, Yelehqārshow, and Yeleh Qārshū) is a village in Garmeh-ye Jonubi Rural District, in the Central District of Meyaneh County, East Azerbaijan Province, Iran. At the 2006 census, its population was 242, in 49 families.

References 

Populated places in Meyaneh County